Metaverpulus is a genus of harvestmen in the family Sclerosomatidae from South Asia.

Species
 Metaverpulus bhutanicus J. Martens, 1987
 Metaverpulus distinctus Suzuki, 1970
 Metaverpulus hirsutus Roewer, 1912
 Metaverpulus kanchensis J. Martens, 1987
 Metaverpulus laevis Roewer, 1955
 Metaverpulus multidentatus J. Martens, 1987
 Metaverpulus persimilis J. Martens, 1987

References

Harvestmen
Harvestman genera